Milbank is a city in Grant County, South Dakota, United States, located along the South Fork of the Whetstone River. The population was 3,544 at the 2020 census. It is the county seat of Grant County. Milbank is the birthplace of American Legion Baseball. The program was created in Milbank in 1925 and is now enjoyed by high school aged youth on more than five thousand teams in all fifty states.

History
The city was founded in 1880 when the Chicago, Milwaukee and St. Paul Railway first laid rails into South Dakota, and was named in honor of railroad director Jeremiah Milbank.  The city was incorporated in 1881.

Geography
Milbank is located at  (45.218583, -96.633721).

Milbank has been assigned the ZIP code range 57252-57253 and the FIPS place code 42260.

Demographics

2010 census
As of the census of 2010, there were 3,353 people, 1,508 households, and 898 families living in the city. The racial makeup of the city was 96.4% White, 0.2% African American, 0.4% Native American, 0.3% Asian, 1.8% from other races, and 0.9% from two or more races. Hispanic or Latino of any race were 3.2% of the population.

There were 1,508 households, of which 25.9% had children under the age of 18 living with them, 47.6% were married couples living together, 8.4% had a female householder with no husband present, 3.6% had a male householder with no wife present, and 40.5% were non-families. 36.7% of all households were made up of individuals, and 17.3% had someone living alone who was 65 years of age or older. The average household size was 2.16 and the average family size was 2.82.

The median age in the city was 46.3 years. 21.8% of residents were under the age of 18; 6.4% were between the ages of 18 and 24; 19.8% were from 25 to 44; 29.5% were from 45 to 64; and 22.3% were 65 years of age or older. The gender makeup of the city was 48.3% male and 51.7% female.

2000 census
As of the census of 2000, there were 3,640 people, 1,533 households, and 964 families living in the city. The population density was 1,367.4 people per square mile (528.4/km2). There were 1,698 housing units at an average density of 637.9 per square mile (246.5/km2). The racial makeup of the city was 98.93% White, 0.03% African American, 0.08% Native American, 0.36% Asian, 0.14% from other races, and 0.47% from two or more races. Hispanic or Latino of any race were 0.36% of the population.

There were 1,533 households, out of which 30.6% had children under the age of 18 living with them, 52.4% were married couples living together, 7.5% had a female householder with no husband present, and 37.1% were non-families. 35.0% of all households were made up of individuals, and 19.9% had someone living alone who was 65 years of age or older. The average household size was 2.25 and the average family size was 2.90.

In the city, the population was spread out, with 24.9% under the age of 18, 6.1% from 18 to 24, 23.5% from 25 to 44, 21.2% from 45 to 64, and 24.3% who were 65 years of age or older. The median age was 42 years. For every 100 females, there were 85.0 males. For every 100 females age 18 and over, there were 81.4 males.

As of 2000 the median income for a household in the city was $28,194, and the median income for a family was $40,117. Males had a median income of $31,486 versus $20,890 for females. The per capita income for the city was $17,446. About 6.8% of families and 10.0% of the population were below the poverty line, including 9.4% of those under age 18 and 9.6% of those age 65 or over.

Media

Newspaper
The Grant County Review is published weekly and provides extensive coverage of the news, sports, school and social activities in Grant County. Communities in the coverage area include Milbank, Big Stone City, Revillo, LaBolt, Stockholm, Strandburg, Summit, Marvin, Twin Brooks, Corona and Wilmot.

AM Radio

FM Radio

Notable people

 C. S. Amsden, President pro tempore of the South Dakota Senate and Speaker pro tempore of the South Dakota House of Representatives
 Clarence (Pug) Manders, a National Football League running back for the Brooklyn Dodgers/Tigers.
 Jack Manders, an NFL running back for the Chicago Bears.
 Tom Patterson, an American entrepreneur, who founded the Tommy John company in 2008.
 Kalen DeBoer, head football coach at University of Washington.

See also
 List of cities in South Dakota

References

External links

 
 Milbank Chamber of Commerce

Cities in South Dakota
Cities in Grant County, South Dakota
County seats in South Dakota
Populated places established in 1880
1880 establishments in Dakota Territory